Farkan may refer to:

Farkan, Kerman
Farkan, Qazvin